Clydebank Waterfront is one of the six wards used to elect members of the West Dunbartonshire Council. It elects four Councillors.

The ward covers southern parts of the town of Clydebank close to the River Clyde including part of the town centre, namely the areas south of the Forth and Clyde Canal around Chalmers Street and Glasgow Road (with the bus station and Clydebank railway station), while everything north of the canal at that point is within the Clydebank Central ward. West of Boquhanran Road tunnel, the boundary between the wards changes from the canal to the Argyle Line / North Clyde Line railway tracks. Residential neighbourhoods in the ward include Clydeholm, Dalmuir, South Mountblow (Clydemuir), Whitecrook and all parts of the adjoining settlement of Old Kilpatrick.

Councillors

Election Results

2022 Election
2022 West Dunbartonshire Council election

2017 Election
2017 West Dunbartonshire Council election

2012 Election
2012 West Dunbartonshire Council election

2007 Election
2007 West Dunbartonshire Council election

References

Wards of West Dunbartonshire
Clydebank